Dirty Work (1988) is the debut novel of American Southern author Larry Brown.

Plot summary
The novel takes place over a period of two days in a VA hospital. Walter James, a white veteran of the Vietnam war, has just been admitted. His face was completely reconstructed after he suffered severe wounds. As a result of a fragment of bullet embedded in his brain, James also suffers blackouts and dizziness.

He meets Braiden Chaney, a black man who lost both of his arms and legs from gunfire in the Vietnam War. He has been in the VA hospital for 22 years. The novel is structured in a stream of consciousness style, much of it taking place within Braiden's mind. He constructs elaborate fantasies, most of which involve his being a king in Africa, to escape the plight of his physical state.

Most of the novel consists of dialogue between the two men. They tell each other their respective stories, mostly during the course of one night, while they drink beer and smoke pot that Braiden's sister has smuggled into the hospital for him. The novel is ultimately a theodicy, as it attempts to explain the paradox of evil in a world created by an omnipotent God. Braiden has several conversations with Jesus during the novel. The reader is left to determine whether they are fantasies or real conversations, the novel implies that they are real.

The plot of the novel borrows from One Flew Over the Cuckoo's Nest, which is referred to in the novel. Braiden, along with his sister, eventually convince Walter to kill him. He has wanted to end his life for years. The novel ends with this event, and Walter reflects, "I knew that somewhere Jesus wept."

1988 American novels
1988 debut novels